Mammillaria mystax is a species of cactus in the subfamily Cactoideae.
It is endemic to the Mexican states of Hidalgo, Oaxaca and central Puebla.

References

Plants described in 1832
mystax